This is the list of prominent people of Melanau descent.

Early history
 Pangeran Matusin (also known as Pangeran Mat Hussin Gagah) – Mukah Governor during Sultanate Brunei. His mother was a Melanau from Kampung Tellian while his father is a prince ("pangeran") from Brunei.
 Orang Kaya Selair – Leader of Matu district before and during reign of Brooke Dynasty
 Orang Kaya Srigunim – A woman who became the leader of Jemoreng district during reign of Brooke Dynasty, killed during pregnancy by her rival.
 Sawing – One of Sharif Masahor army leader during attack on Kanowit Fort 1859, who killed Henry Steel & Charles Fox. He was a Melanau of the Kanowit sub-group. 
 Salakai – Sawing close friend who fought together during attack on Kanowit Fort 1859.

Academics
 Associate Professor Dr Haji Abdul Mutalip Abdullah – The former dean of the Faculty of Social Sciences Universiti Malaysia Sarawak (UNIMAS)
 Datu Hj Adi Badiozaman Tuah – Well-known educationist. Former Education Director (Examinations) Malaysia. Director (Education) for Yayasan Islam Sarawak. He is of mixed Javanese, Malay and Melanau parentage. 
 Associate Professor Dr. Jeniri bin Amir - Council of Professors fellow, former lecturer of the Faculty of Language and Communication, UNIMAS and a political analyst.
 Datuk Prof. Dr Rashid Abdullah – Academician UNIMAS.
 Prof Dr. Rohani Abdullah @ Josephine Yaman – Academician UPM
 Prof. Dr. Sulaiman Hanapi – Academician UNIMAS.
 Prof Datu Dr. Yusuf Hadi – Academician UNIMAS.

Entertainment

Fashion
 Abdul Latip Mohti (1971 - 10 June 2020) – A fashion designer hailed from Mukah and the founder of Latip's Collections. In 2019, he was named "Most Promising Designer" at the Borneo Fashion Week. He was also known for his ‘Batik Linut’ (batik made from sago wax) design.
 Rozie Khan – designer and founder of Rozie Khan Couture. At the 2018 Borneo Fashion Week, she was awarded "Designer of the Year". She is of mixed-parentage of Melanau, Chinese, Kampar (Indonesia) and Brunei descent and hails from Dalat.

Music
 Anding Indrawani Zaini – Akademi Fantasia star, model, actor and singer. He is of mixed Melanau-Bidayuh parentage.
 Len Bubat – Melanau song composer/ producer/ lyricist (first Melanau original album 2002). This album Cinta Tuwah was launched by the Chief Minister of Sarawak in Miri, Sarawak during the Persatuan Melanau Miri 40th Anniversary Celebration on 24 October 2002. Two popular songs from this album are the "Blues Tubeng Balau" and "Bier Kou Tuwad".
 Sharifah Zarina – A singer most notable for her hit, "Langit Ke-7"
 Tazudin Murni – Melanau song composer/producer/arranger/sound designer/ANUM guitarist (ANUM First Melanau Original Rock Song Album 2006)
 Raymond Enyau Belidih – Melanau singer awarded Penyanyi Lagu Melanau Terbilang 2019 - song Serbak Salak (2017)

Politics
 Abu Seman Jahwie – Former politician.
 Tun Pehin Sri Dr. Hj. Abdul Taib Mahmud – 4th Chief Minister of Sarawak & 7th Yang di-Pertua Negeri (Governor) of Sarawak.
 Tun Abdul Rahman Ya'kub – 3rd Chief Minister of Sarawak & 4th Yang di-Pertua Negeri (Governor) of Sarawak.
 Tun Ahmad Zaidi Adruce Muhammad Nor – 5th Yang di-Pertua Negeri (Governor) of Sarawak.
 Tun Abang Muhammad Salahuddin Abang Barieng – 6th Yang di-Pertua Negeri (Governor) of Sarawak.
YB Dato' Sri Fatimah Abdullah – State Legislative Assembly Member for Dalat and Sarawak Minister of Welfare, Women and Family Development. She is of Foochow Chinese and Melanau descent.
 Lukanisman Awang Sauni – Member of Parliament of Sibuti since 2018.
 Datuk Dr. Annuar Rapaee – State Deputy Minister of Education and Talent Development since 2022, Member of the Legislative Assembly for Nangka since 2011.
 Datuk Hj Hamden Hj Ahmad – Former politician and a corporate figure (Oil-palm plantation).
 Dato Hanifah Hajar Taib – Member of Parliament for Mukah.
Dato' Murshid Diraja Dr. Juanda Jaya – former Mufti of Perlis, former Deputy Mufti of Sarawak and current State Legislative Assembly Member for Jemoreng.
 Datu Haji Len Talif Salleh – Assistant Minister of Urban Development and Resources.
 Tan Sri Dato' Sri Dr. Muhammad Leo Michael Toyad – Former Federal Minister of Tourism; Chairman, Sarawak Conventions Bureau.
 Tan Sri Mohd Effendi Norwawi – Former Minister in the Prime Minister's Department, former Dalat Assemblyman;
Dato' Seri Nancy Shukri – Federal Minister of Tourism, and Member of the Parliament for Batang Sadong. She is of mixed heritage of Malay, Melanau, Scottish, Iban and Chinese.
 Datuk Hajjah Norah Abdul Rahman – Daughter of Tun Abdul Rahman Ya'kub and former Member of Parliament of Tanjong Manis;
 Dato' Sri Sulaiman Abdul Rahman Taib – Son of Tun Abdul Taib Mahmud. A corporate figure who was Member of Parliament for Kota Samarahan;
 Datuk Wahab Dollah – Former politician.
 Yossibnosh Balo – State Legislative Assembly Member for Balingian.

Others
 Zaini Oje @ Ozea – former Director of Dewan Bahasa dan Pustaka (DBP) Sarawak & Sabah. A poet, writer, theater & stage director.
 Mohamad Taufan Mohamad Yassin – Social activist
 Hang Tuah Merawin – Resident, Kapit Division
 Hj Sarudu Hoklai – Permanent Secretary to Ministry of Planning (Sarawak). Former Resident, Mukah, Kota Samarahan and Kapit (Sarawak)
 Akit Sebli – Former Permanent Secretary Ministry of Tourism Sarawak
 Dr Haji Mohamad Topek Taufek Nahrawi – Businessman, developer and contractor, Former Deputy Chairman of SEDC, Academic
 Datu Aloysius J. Dris – CEO of Angkatan Zaman Mansang (AZAM) Sarawak.
 Edmund Kurui – Former assistant curator Sarawak Museum
 Datuk Hamid Sepawi – Corporate leader, CEO of Naim Cendera Group, well known property and housing developer and public listed company
 Sahari Ubu – Staff Sergeant Royal Corps of Signal British Army 1962 Staff No 23895416, Penghulu Kampung Nangka, Sibu.
 Tuan Haji Mohamad Atei Abang Medaan – Mayor (Datuk Bandar) of Kuching North (Dewan Bandaraya Kuching Utara (DBKU))
 Datuk Dr Yusof Hanifah – Former mayor of Kuching North (Dewan Bandaraya Kuching Utara (DBKU))
 Rapaee Kawi  (a.k.a. Apai or Mashor) (1958–2009) – First Sarawakian to scale Mount Everest, ex-commando and Sarawak's most senior national press photographer
Dr. Junaidi bin Hj. Diki – Public health medicine physician, senior HCISB consultant SAINS, Ex Dep Hos Director SGH, DHO Sibu/Kuching/Samarahan/Bintulu
Datuk Haji Abang Abdul Wahap Haji Abang Julai – Mayor (Datuk Bandar) of Kuching North (Dewan Bandaraya Kuching Utara (DBKU))
M. Zulfadhli Zainudin – Sarawakian tycoon, businessman, investor, and philanthropist
Diana Rose – cultural activist and the founder of Lamin Dana Resort.
Datu Sajeli bin Kipli – General Manager of the Land Custody and Development Authority (LCDA)
Pemanca Albert Kiro bin Abau (The Late)

References 

Ethnic groups in Sarawak
Austronesian peoples